Alexandrovsky is a rural locality (a khutor) in Krivle-Ilyushkinsky Selsoviet, Kuyurgazinsky District, Bashkortostan, Russia. The population was 3 as of 2010. There is 1 street.

Geography 
Alexandrovsky is located 26 km northeast of Yermolayevo (the district's administrative centre) by road. Kuznetsovsky is the nearest rural locality.

References 

Rural localities in Kuyurgazinsky District